Anton Gvajc ( 21 August 1865 - August 3 1935) was a Slovene painter. The majority of his work is genre and landscape painting. He also worked as a teacher in Gorica, Trieste and Maribor.

References

External links

1865 births
1935 deaths
Slovenian painters
Slovenian male painters
Artists from Ljubljana